"Atingkok" (literally, "father void") is the Supreme Creator God of the universe in Meitei mythology and religion.
He is regarded as the legendary male ancestor of the living beings on the earth.

Names

In Sanamahism (Meitei religion), Atingkok, the Supreme God is known with 1000 names as mentioned in multiple Meitei scriptures. In Sanamahism, the Supreme God, himself, is the Creator of the Universe as well as the King of the Heaven. He is also the God of the Sky. He is the one who controls weather, rain, thunder and lightning.

See also
 List of figures in Meitei mythology

References

Further reading

Other websites 

Meitei culture
Meitei folklore
Meitei mythology
Manipur
Kings in Meitei mythology
Meitei deities
Sanamahism
Sky and weather gods